Fagus × taurica, the Crimean beech, is a deciduous tree in the beech genus Fagus. The Balkan beech Fagus moesiaca is considered to be the same species. It has been thought to be a hybrid between F. orientalis and F. sylvatica, but the relationships between Eurasian beeches are still unclear, and it may show greater affinity with F. orientalis.

References

taurica
Trees of Europe
Hybrid plants
Crimea